Mohammad Akram "Khakrezwal" (died 2005) was a former police chief of Kabul who was killed in a suicide bomb attack soon after being appointed Vice Chief of Staff of the Afghan National Army. He had also served as commander of southern forces during Afghanistan's communist era.

References

2005 deaths
Afghan terrorism victims
Deaths by improvised explosive device in Afghanistan
Male murder victims
Afghan police officers
Year of birth missing